The Peciko gas field is a natural gas field located in the South China Sea. It was discovered in 1977 and developed by Total E&P Indonesie. It began production in 1999 and produces natural gas and condensates. The total proven reserves of the Peciko gas field are around 6.2 trillion cubic feet (150×109m³), and production is slated to be around 60 million cubic feet/day (1.68×105m³).

References

Natural gas fields in Indonesia